Highway 9 is an east-west limited-access expressway in Israel that opened to traffic on July 24, 2014.

It has four lanes, two in each direction. It is located south of Hadera, connecting the Trans-Israel Highway, Highway 4, and Highway 2 and was finished July 24, 2014. The maximum speed is 110 km/h. The highway is currently 10.2 km, but should be 12.2 km long after the completion of the Baqa-Jatt Interchange in 2015.

History
Highway 9 was approved by the Supreme Court of Israel on October 24, 2010. The purpose of Highway 9 is to connect the Trans-Israel Highway, Highway 4, and Highway 2 in the center of the country. A small part of the route of Highway 9 already existed near the Baqa-Jatt Interchange and was called Highway 61.

On May 2, 2011 the National Roads Company of Israel released a tender for the construction of a four-lane road between Highway 4 and the Trans-Israel Highway at the cost of 700 million NIS with construction being completed in 2014 and Highway 9 being opened to the public on July 24, 2014.

Highway 9 was first built with two lanes in each direction, but preparation includes a future third lane in the center, to avoid damaging the side of the road during construction. Highway 9 includes a diamond interchange south of the city of Hadera, connecting the city to the national road system. In addition, five new bridges were built, two overpasses and three underpasses along Highway 9.

Junctions & Interchanges

See also
List of highways in Israel

External links
 Proposed Highway 9 mapped in Openstreetmap

9
9